Christian "Büdi" Blunck (born 28 June 1968 in Hamburg) is a former field hockey midfield player from Germany.

He represented the Men's National Team at the 1992 Summer Olympics in Barcelona, Spain, winning the gold medal  and being named the Best Player of the Olympic Tournament.   He was also on the side that competed at the 1996 Summer Olympics in Atlanta, United States, where they finished fourth.

Blunck's mother Greta also played for the German national team. He resigned from the national squad in 1998. He played club hockey in Germany for Harvestehuder THC.

References

External links
 
 

1968 births
Living people
Field hockey players at the 1992 Summer Olympics
Field hockey players at the 1996 Summer Olympics
German male field hockey players
Olympic field hockey players of Germany
Olympic gold medalists for Germany
Field hockey players from Hamburg
Olympic medalists in field hockey
Medalists at the 1992 Summer Olympics
1998 Men's Hockey World Cup players
Male field hockey midfielders
Harvestehuder THC players